Goostrey railway station serves the village of Goostrey in Cheshire, England. The station is on the Crewe to Manchester Line 10½ miles (16 km) north east of Crewe.

History
The line was built by the Manchester and Birmingham Railway Company and completed on 10 August 1842.  Goostrey station was added by the London & North Western Railway Company, opening on 1 September 1891. In a 1971 photo a keystone on the platform at the foot of a mast had the MBR coat of arms and an inscription, 'MBR 1844 G. W. Buck Engineer'. In 1958 it had been removed from the Manchester side of the road bridge at the station, when it was rebuilt to provide clearance for the electric wires; the keystone on the Crewe side showed W. Baker as engineer, but was broken when it was removed.

Service 

There is generally an hourly service southbound to Crewe and northbound to Manchester Piccadilly via Stockport with a limited number of services a day to Manchester via Manchester Airport (peak hours only).

The May 2018 timetable also saw the introduction of an hourly Sunday service to Manchester Piccadilly and Crewe. Services are operated by Northern.

Friends of Goostrey Station

A Friends Group was founded on 1 May 2012.

References

Further reading

External links

 Crewe-Manchester Community Rail Partnership
 Official website for the Friends of Goostrey Station

Railway stations in Cheshire
DfT Category F2 stations
Former London and North Western Railway stations
Railway stations in Great Britain opened in 1891
Northern franchise railway stations